Marcus Domitius Calvinus (or possibly Lucius Domitius Calvinus) (died 79 BC) was an ancient Roman politician and military commander who was killed during the early stages of the Sertorian War.

Career
Domitius Calvinus was a member of the plebeian gens Domitia, who was elected praetor, serving in the office around the year 80 BC.

For the following year (79 BC) he was assigned the propraetorian province of Hispania Citerior. His tenure coincided with the outbreak of the Sertorian War. Quintus Sertorius, an opponent of the dictator Lucius Cornelius Sulla, had landed in Hispania Ulterior, and defeated its propraetor, Lucius Fufidius. Sertorius then took control of Hispania Ulterior while his legate and quaestor Lucius Hirtuleius marched on Domitius Calvinus in Hispania Citerior. In the meantime, the Senate decided that a more experienced commander was required. Therefore, they turned Hispania Ulterior into a proconsular province and sent the proconsul Metellus Pius as its new governor, and also gave him the command of the war against Sertorius.

It was around this time, with Metellus Pius on his way, that Domitius Calvinus crossed over into Hispania Ulterior, but found his passage blocked by the army of Hirtuleius who had fortified Consabura. Hirtuleius wore down Domitius Calvinus’s army by guerrilla warfare.

Eventually a battle was fought at the Anas river; here, the two forces engaged each other, with the end result that Domitius’ army was defeated. Domitius Calvinus either died in battle or was killed by his own troops as a peace-offering  by his own troops who defected to the rebels.

Metellus Pius, unaware of the disaster, had already sent a legate named Lucius Thorius Balbus to provide assistance to Domitius Calvinus, but he too was defeated, this time by Sertorius. Calvinus’ replacement as governor was Quintus Calidius.

Footnotes

References

Sources
 Brennan, T. Corey, The Praetorship in the Roman Republic, Volume 2 (2000)
 Broughton, T. Robert S., The Magistrates of the Roman Republic, Vol II (1951)
 Smith, William, Dictionary of Greek and Roman Biography and Mythology, Vol I (1867).

79 BC deaths
1st-century BC Romans
Ancient Romans killed in action
Calvinus, Marcus
Roman governors of Hispania Citerior
Roman Republican praetors
Year of birth unknown